Akhaura–Agartala line is an under construction railway line between Bangladesh and India.

History
The governments of the two countries signed a memorandum of understanding on 21 May 2013 to connect Agartala railway station in India's northeastern state of Tripura and Akhaura Junction railway station in Bangladesh. The total length of the railway line will be 15.054 km, of which only 5 km is on the Indian side and the rest on the Bangladesh side. Construction of the railway began on 29 July 2018. Construction was supposed to be completed in 2020, but that was not possible due to the COVID-19 pandemic. Its construction period was later pushed back to May 2021. Its deadline were then set for June 2022 and June 2023, respectively.

References

Brahmanbaria District
Transport in Agartala
Dual gauge railways in Bangladesh
5 ft 6 in gauge railways in India
Proposed railway lines in Asia
Bangladesh–India relations
Cross-border railway lines in Bangladesh